Metro Toronto Parks and Culture was a department within the former   Regional Municipality of Metropolitan Toronto .

The department was responsible for maintaining major parks and cultural sites around Metro Toronto, Ontario, Canada.

Parks - now under Toronto Parks and Recreation
 Morningside Park 
 Glen Rouge Park and stables 
 Humber Bay Park 
 Colonel Samuel Smith Park 
 Sunnybrook Park and stables 
 Toronto Islands and the Toronto Island ferries 
 Bluffers Park
 Colonel Danforth Park 
 Lower Don Parkland / Don Valley Brickworks 
 Marie Curtis Park

Culture
 O'Keefe Centre - now the Sony Centre for the Performing Arts
 Metro Toronto Zoo - now Toronto Zoo
 Black Creek Pioneer Village
 Toronto Heritage
 Exhibition Place - park used by the Canadian National Exhibition or "The Ex"
 Museums other than the Royal Ontario Museum, Bata Shoe Museum

Post Amalgamation

After 1997 these services under this department is now under Toronto Parks and Recreation.

References
 Toronto Parks

Metropolitan Toronto